Delcambre High School is a grade 612 high school in Delcambre, Vermilion Parish, Louisiana, United States. Despite its location in Vermillion Parish it is in the Iberia Parish School System. It is located at 601 W Main St. Delcambre, LA 70528

Athletics
Delcambre High athletics competes in the LHSAA.

References

External links

Education in Iberia Parish, Louisiana
Schools in Vermilion Parish, Louisiana
Public high schools in Louisiana
Public middle schools in Louisiana